Michał Paluta (born 4 October 1995) is a Polish professional racing cyclist, who currently rides for UCI Continental team . In October 2020, he was named in the startlist for the 2020 Vuelta a España.

Major results
2013
 1st  Time trial, National Junior Road Championships
2015
 1st  Road race, National Under-23 Road Championships
2016
 1st  Road race, National Under-23 Road Championships
 2nd Overall Carpathian Couriers Race
2019
 1st  Road race, National Road Championships
 8th Korona Kocich Gór
2021
 8th Prueba Villafranca - Ordiziako Klasika
 10th GP Adria Mobil

Grand Tour general classification results timeline

References

External links
 

1995 births
Living people
Polish male cyclists
People from Strzelce-Drezdenko County